The 2nd tier in the Bolivian Football pyramid consists of 9 regional leagues (one for each department), the number of participants varies depending on the department,  It usually has between 8 and 12 teams.  Both winner and runner-up of each league compete in the Copa Simón Bolívar, with the winner of such tournament gaining promotion to the 1st Division, and the runner-up playing a play-off match with the 11th placed team in the 1st Division.  Until 1976 all 8 regional championships (Pando didn't have an organized tournament at the time) were the top in the national football pyramid, with the winner of the Copa Simón Bolívar being crowned as national champion.

The oldest regional championship is the one played in La Paz, it started in 1914 and it was considered for many years as the top Bolivian league, even more when it turned into a semi-pro tournament in 1950 and started including teams from Oruro and Cochabamba.

6 teams with the best average qualify for Aerosur Cup 2010 Qualifying Round.

Changes from last season

From Bolivian Football League 2008
Promoted to Liga de Fútbol Profesional Boliviano 2009
 Nacional Potosí

Relegated to  Regional League 
 Guabirá

Champions and Runner-up from Primera A (Regional League)

Group phase

Group A1

Group A2

Group B1

Group B2

Group C

Quarterfinals
The ties are played in two legs, with the first leg taking place on 31 October 2009 and the second leg being played on 7 November 2009. Each club will play one leg at home. The winners on aggregate will advance to the semifinals. In case of both teams being tied on aggregate after both matches a penalty shootout will be conducted.

|}

First leg

Second leg

Semi-finals

 In this Round Stomers San Lorenzo qualified as the best loser

|}

First leg

Second leg

Final

|}

First leg

Second leg

References

2009 in Bolivian football leagues
Copa Simón Bolívar seasons